Devil's Slide is the name of several geological formations. It may refer to:

 Devil's Slide (California), a promontory in the San Francisco Bay Area
 Devil's Slide (Utah), a rock formation in Utah
 Devil's Slide (Montana), a rock formation in Montana
 A portion of the Old Santa Susana Stage Road in Southern California
 A rock formation on the Hawaiian island of Nihoa
 A rock formation on the island of Lundy, England
 Teufelsrutsch, a rock formation in Germany
 "Devil's Slide", a song by Joe Satriani on his album Engines of Creation